Joseph A. Carpe (January 23, 1903 – November 3, 1977) was a professional football player in the early National Football League. A native of Westville, Illinois, Carpe attended Millikin University. He made his NFL debut in 1926 with the Frankford Yellow Jackets. That year, he was a member of the Yellow Jackets NFL Championship team. He also played for the Pottsville Maroons, Boston Bulldogs, and was an original member of the Philadelphia Eagles.

References

External links

1903 births
1977 deaths
American football halfbacks
Boston Bulldogs (NFL) players
Frankford Yellow Jackets players
Millikin Big Blue football players
Philadelphia Eagles players
Pottsville Maroons players
People from Vermilion County, Illinois
Players of American football from Illinois
Burials in Massachusetts